The Cross of Adelheid is an 11th-12th century reliquary in the form of a crux gemmata. It is held in Saint Paul's Abbey, Lavanttal. It was commissioned by Adelheid, daughter of Rudolf of Rheinfelden, passing to St. Blaise Abbey in the 19th century before coming to its present home. It is made of a wooden core covered with gilded silver plate. On the front are gems, pearls and precious stones. It is 82.9 cm high, 65.4 cm wide and 7.4 to 7.8 cm deep.

References

External links
http://wwwg.uni-klu.ac.at/kultdoku/kataloge/01/html/25.htm
http://www.aeiou.at/aeiou.photo.index/s/st_paul_im_lavanttal/st_paul_im_lavanttal__adelheid-kreuz_aus_dem_11_jh_im.htm

Reliquary crosses
Crux gemmata
11th-century sculptures
12th-century sculptures
Romanesque sculptures